was a Japanese journalist,  Vice President of the Asahi Shimbun newspaper and later a politician. During the war, he joined the Imperial Rule Assistance Association. After the end of the war, he was purged from public service. Later, he became the Chief Secretary of the 4th Yoshida Cabinet, Vice President and then President of the Liberal Party of Japan of Japan, but he died before becoming a prime minister.

Life

He was born in Yamagata City, Yamagata Prefecture, in 1888 as the third son of Ogata Dōhei, the secretary of Yamagata Prefecture. At age 4, he went to Fukuoka city because his father became the secretary of Fukuoka Prefecture. He studied at Fukuoka Prefectural Shuyukan High School, where Seigō Nakano was his one-year senior. Of the same age was Daigorō Yasukawa. They later became influential friends. He graduated from Waseda University in 1911 and joined the Tokyo branch of the Osaka Asahi Shimbun.

In 1925, Ogata became the editor of the Tokyo Asahi Shimbun. In 1928, he became one of the executive directors of the Asahi Shimbun. In 1936, he became the chief editor and in 1943 Vice-President of the Asahi Shimbun. In 1940, he joined the Taisei Yokusankai (大政翼賛会, "Imperial Rule Assistance Association") which was Japan's fascist organization created by Prime Minister Fumimaro Konoe on October 12, 1940, to promote the goals of his Shintaisei ("New Order") movement. In 1944, Ogata went into the political world and became the Minister of State of the Koiso Cabinet, President of the Intelligence Bureau, and Vice President of the Imperial Rule Assistance Association. In April 1945, he resigned from the post. After the war, he became an adviser to the Higashikuni Cabinet. In December 1945, he was investigated for his war-time activities by the Allied Occupational authorities. In August 1946, he was purged from public service.

After 1952 when Japan regained independence, Ogata was elected as a member of the House of Representatives for three terms. In the same year, he became the Chief Cabinet Secretary of the 4th Yoshida Cabinet and the vice president of the ruling Liberal Party of Japan. In 1953, he became the President of the Liberal Party of Japan. However, he died in January 1956, while he was anticipating his election as prime minister.

Works
From the end of the Meiji era to the Pacific War  Ogata Taketora  Asahi Shimbun history editing room, 1951

Further reading

References
Newspapers- Capitalism and Management of Asahi Shimbun and Hardships of Ogata Taketora Imanishi Mitsuo, Asahi Shimbun, 2007, 
Asahi Shimbun during Occupation and Responsibilities for War, Murayama Nagaosa and Ogata Taketora, Imanishi Matsuo, Asahi Shimbun, 2008. 
20th Century Japan Person Encyclopedia  from A to Se  Nichigai Associates, 2004, p. 552

|-

|-

|-

Japanese politicians
Japanese journalists
The Asahi Shimbun people
1888 births
1956 deaths
Waseda University alumni
Deputy Prime Ministers of Japan
Grand Cordons of the Order of the Rising Sun
20th-century journalists